The 2021 Heat Latin Music Awards were held on July 1, 2021, at Cap Cana in Punta Cana, Dominican Republic, celebrating the best of Latin music in its sixth edition. The ceremony was broadcast live from HTV, and was hosted by Kunno and Melina Ramírez. Karol G received the most nominations on the ceremony, being nominated for six awards. Myke Towers and Anitta won the most awards of the ceremony with 2 awards each.

Gloria Trevi was honored with the Engagement Award for her social work with her "Ana Dalai Foundation", Wisin was honored with the Gold Artist Award, Anitta with the Feminine Empowerment Award and Arcángel & Wilkins were honored for they artistic career.

Winners and nominees 

Winners are listed first and in bold.

References

Heat Latin